Horacio Zeballos was the defending champion, but chose not to participate.Eduardo Schwank won in the final 6–4, 6–2 against Juan Pablo Brzezicki.

Seeds

Draw

Finals

Top half

Bottom half

External links
Main Draw
Qualifying Draw

Seguros Bolivar Open Bucaramanga - Singles
2010 Singles